Hall of the People is a station on Line 3 and Line 4 of the Qingdao Metro. It opened on 18 December 2016 for Line 3 and 26 December 2022 for Line 4.

Gallery

References

Qingdao Metro stations
Railway stations in China opened in 2016